Maribel Fernández  (born 9 March 1951 in Mexico City, Mexico) is a Mexican television and film actress, also known in some works as La Pelangocha.

Career
Maribel Fernández has worked in many Mexican films and telenovelas. She also worked with Chespirito, playing one of the versions of the character "Gloria" in El Chavo del Ocho.

Filmography

Films

Television

References

External links 
 

1953 births
Living people
Chespirito actors
Mexican film actresses
Mexican telenovela actresses
Mexican television actresses